"The Christmas Shoes" is a Christmas-themed song by the Christian vocal group NewSong. It was written by NewSong group members Eddie Carswell and Leonard Ahlstrom, and St. Louis syndicated radio personality Isaiah "DC" Daniel (of Steve & DC).  The song was released through Benson Records as a bonus track on their 2000 album Sheltering Tree, at the urging of DC, who also co-produced the tune in the summer of 2000. It peaked at No. 31 on the Billboard Hot Country Songs chart spent one week at No. 1 on the Adult Contemporary chart and No. 42 on the Hot 100 chart.

Content
The song recounts the events experienced by a narrator completing the last of his gift shopping on Christmas Eve. He is waiting in a checkout line but is "not really in the Christmas mood" when he notices a young boy in front of him who wants to buy a pair of shoes for his terminally-ill mother: the boy tells the cashier he wants her to appear beautiful when she meets Jesus. Since he is short on money, the narrator ends up paying for the shoes, which reminds him of the true meaning of Christmas.

Cover versions and other media
One year after NewSong released the song, country music girl group 3 of Hearts released their own version, which peaked at No. 39 on the country chart.

In 2002, Donna VanLiere produced a novelization of the song which was published in 2002 by St. Martin's Press. The book became a made-for-TV movie released in December 2002.

In 2005 Dutch singer René Froger recorded the song for his Pure Christmas album.

Pop-punk band FM Static released a cover of this song in 2008.

Criticism
The song has appeared on various "worst Christmas song" lists. In 2011, the song was named "The Worst Christmas Song Ever" by Jezebel.com, following a weeks-long survey of commented votes.

An animated video of American comedian Patton Oswalt's performance at the Lisner Auditorium about the song was posted on YouTube in November 2009. In it, Oswalt  refers to the song as a "sick evening prayer".

Certifications

See also
List of number-one adult contemporary singles of 2001 (U.S.)

References

2000 singles
2001 singles
American Christmas songs
Fictional footwear
3 of Hearts songs
NewSong songs
2000 songs
Songs about death